Millsap or Millsaps is a surname of English and Irish origin. Derived from a nickname for a "spiritless man", the name is borrowed from Middle English for milksop, meaning "piece of bread soaked in milk". It has been suggested that it may have been an occupational name for a farmer who dealt with milk products. 

A variant, Millsop, is also derived from similar origins, and is found in County Armagh and County Down in Ulster.

Places
 Millsap, Texas

Education
 Millsaps College, liberal arts college located in Jackson, Mississippi
 Millsaps Majors, sports teams in the athletic program of Millsaps College above
Millsap Independent School District, public school district based in Millsap, Texas
Millsap High School, public high school part of the Millsap Independent School District schools

Persons
Millsap
Elijah Millsap (born 1987), American international basketball player of American-Filipino origin
Paul Millsap (born 1985), American NBA basketball player
Roger Millsap (1954–2014), American psychometrician
Millsaps
Jesse Jackson Millsaps (1827-1900), Arkansas politician
Patrick N. Millsaps (born 1973), American lawyer 
Reuben Webster Millsaps (1833-1916), American businessman, financier and philanthropist
William Millsaps (born 1939), bishop of the Episcopal Missionary Church

See also
Ronnie Milsap (born 1943), American country music singer